Maslin Sham bin Razman is a Malaysian politician from UMNO. He is the Member of Perak State Legislative Assembly for Bukit Chandan from 2013 to November 2022.

Early career 
He was a Director of a computer software company before joining politics.

Political career 
He is the Chief of UMNO Kuala Kangsar branch and Deputy Chairman of KSK Parlimen Kuala Kangsar.

Election result

References 

United Malays National Organisation politicians
Members of the Perak State Legislative Assembly
Malaysian people of Malay descent
Living people
Year of birth missing (living people)